2017 LAF season is the second season of the LAF, the main competition of american football clubs in Eastern Europe. Organised by the Federation of American Football of Russia (FAFR).

Minsk Litwins and Ekaterinburg Piranhas, initially registered, did not take part in the league. The season began in May 2017 and concluded in September 2017, when Moscow Patriots won their 14th title.

Format 
24 clubs from 18 cities competed in 5 divisions. The best club reaching the playoffs.

Teams

Regular season
% = percentage of victories, GP = Games played, W = matches won,  L = lost games, GF = goals for, GA = Goals against

LAF North

LAF Ural

LAF Volga

LAF Premier

Playoff

XVIII Russkij Bowl

2017